"Po Pimp" is the debut single by Do or Die, it served as the lead single from their debut album, Picture This. The song was produced by The Legendary Traxster and featured a guest verse from fellow Chicago rapper Twista and vocals from R&B singer Johnny P.

Background
"Po Pimp" was originally released independently in the group's native Chicago. The song became a local hit and caught the attention of prominent Houston-based hip hop label Rap-a-Lot Records, who signed the trio to a record deal. Rap-a-Lot then released "Po Pimp" nationwide in the summer of 1996 and it quickly became a breakthrough hit for the trio. It peaked at No. 22 on the Billboard Hot 100 on October 19 and also reached No. 1 on the Hot Rap Singles chart. By the end of 1996, "Po Pimp" had become one of the most popular and best selling singles of the year; it sold 600,000 copies, earning a gold certification from the RIAA, and was listed in Billboard's Year-End Hot 100 Singles of 1996 at No. 91.

This song, later, had 4 sequels: "Still Po Pimpin" from "Headz Or Tailz", "Sex Appeal" from "Back 2 Tha Game" and "Do U?" from "Pimpin Ain't Dead", the 4th sequel is on "Category F5" by Twista called "Yo Body"

Single track listing
"Po Pimp" (Radio Version)- 3:57  
"Po Pimp" (Dirty Version)- 4:00  
"Promise"- 4:39  
"Promise" (Instrumental)- 4:39

Charts and certifications

Weekly charts

Year-end charts

Certifications

References

Songs about procurers
Songs about prostitutes
1996 debut singles
Do or Die (group) songs
Twista songs
1996 songs